Sandro de Gouveia (born 28 July 1968) is a retired Namibian footballer. He competed for the Namibia national football team from 1996–1998, including the 1998 African Cup of Nations. He played as a midfielder.

References

1968 births
Living people
Namibia international footballers
Namibian men's footballers
1998 African Cup of Nations players
Blue Waters F.C. players

Association football midfielders